Mark E. Bell (born August 30, 1957, Wichita, Kansas) is a former American football defensive end and tight end who played six seasons in the National Football League. His twin brother Mike Bell, also played in the NFL and at Colorado State.  His son, Blake Bell, was a quarterback who later moved to tight end for the Oklahoma Sooners.  Blake Bell was drafted by the San Francisco 49ers in 2015. Mike and Mark Bell both live in Wichita, Kansas.

External links 
 NFL.com player page

1957 births
Living people
Players of American football from Wichita, Kansas
American football defensive ends
American football tight ends
Colorado State Rams football players
Seattle Seahawks players
Baltimore Colts players
Indianapolis Colts players
American twins
Twin sportspeople